Yurii Georgiyovych Naidyuk (Ukrainian: Юрій Георгійович Найдюк; born 23 July 1955) is a Ukrainian physicist, Director of the B.I. Verkin Institute for Low Temperature Physics and Engineering of the National Academy of Sciences of Ukraine. He is a corresponding member of the National Academy of Sciences of Ukraine (NASU). He has been awarded the State Prize of Ukraine in Science and Technology and the B. I. Verkin Prize of the National Academy of Sciences of Ukraine. He is the editor-in-chief of the academic journal Low Temperature Physics.

Biography 
Yurii G. Naidyuk was born on 23 July 1955, in the village of Bogdanivka in the Rivne Region, USSR, Ukrainian SSR. He graduated summa cum laude from high school in 1971. In 1976 he graduated summa cum laude from the Faculty  of Physics at Kharkiv State University. Since graduation, he has worked at the B.I. Verkin Institute for Low Temperature Physics and Engineering of the National Academy of Sciences of Ukraine (ILTPE), Kharkiv, Ukraine. In 1982 he defended his dissertation for the Candidate's Degree (Ph.D. equivalent) in Physical and Mathematical Sciences on "Investigation of the mechanisms of scattering of conduction electrons in metal point contacts" (Research supervisor I.K. Yanson). He became a senior research fellow in 2000. In 2001 he defended his second dissertation for the Doctor's Degree in Physical and Mathematical Sciences with a thesis titled: "Point contact spectroscopy of highly correlated electronic systems". He has been a professor since 2011. From 2003 to 2011 Naidyuk was a lead researcher at the B.I. Verkin ILTPE. In 2011 he became Chair of the Department of Point Contact Spectroscopy at the B.I. Verkin ILTPE. Since early 2021 he has served as the Director of the B.I. Verkin ILTPE. Naidyuk interned and worked at various international research centers.

Scientific research activity 
The main field of Naidyuk's scientific research is the study of the interaction of conduction electrons with quasiparticle excitations in solids using the method of point contact spectroscopy; research of strongly correlated electronic systems and point contact spectroscopy of topical superconductors, including promising ones such as magnesium diboride, rare-earth nickel-borocarbide compounds, newest iron-based superconductors, and topological semimetals. Naidyuk has been researching electronic transport in point contacts at ultrahigh current densities and strong electric fields at low temperatures, charge and spin transfer processes in nanoscale structures based on magnetically ordered compounds and materials.

Naidyuk is the author or co-author of over 120 scientific articles and three review publications indexed in SCOPUS and Web of Science databases. With I. K. Yanson he co-authored the monograph "Point-contact spectroscopy" in 2005.

Naidyuk is actively collaborating with European, American, and Chinese scientists and is regularly invited to conduct collaborative scientific research. For over five years, he worked in research centers such as The Grenoble High Magnetic Field Laboratory (France), Karlsruhe University (Germany), KTH Royal Institute of Technology in Stockholm (Sweden), The Institute of Experimental Physics of the Slovak Academy of Sciences in Košice (Slovakia), The University of Turku (Finland), Texas A&M University, College Station, TX (USA), The Leibniz Institute for Solid State and Materials Research Dresden (Germany).

The most notable results of Naidyuk's scientific research activity:

 Development and implementation of the point-contact spectroscopy method for the study of the interaction of conduction electrons with quasiparticle excitations, including phonons, local and quasilocal vibrations, magnetic impurities (Kondo effect).
 Thermal effects in point contacts have been studied, and modulation point contact spectroscopy has been developed. The effects caused by ultra-high current density in point contacts were detected, among them the thermoelectric Seebeck and Peltier effects. The possibility of phase transition detection under the influence of high electric current was shown.
 Crystal-electric-field effects have been revealed in intermetallic compounds with rare-earth ions, in which the Zeeman splitting and paramagnon excitations were detected for the first time using point contact spectroscopy.
 The temperature and magnetic field dependence of the order parameter in simple Zn, Sn, In, and Nb superconductors have been investigated based on the Andreev reflection spectroscopy, which has provided experimental substantiation of the existing theory.
 A method of point contact spectroscopy for a family of heavy fermion compounds in the normal and superconducting states has been developed. The peculiarities of the surface superconducting state and the quantization of conductivity in these compounds were revealed.
 Two-gap superconducting states of magnesium diboride MgB2 have been detected by using the Andreev reflection method. The anisotropy of the electron-phonon interaction in this compound was established.
 The two-gap nature of superconductivity in rare-earth nickel-borocarbide compounds has been experimentally confirmed on the basis of the analysis of the peculiarities of their Andreev reflection spectra. The spectra of electron-quasiparticle interaction were studied, the low-frequency quasiparticle mode was found, and the effects of the crystal-electric-field in these compounds were revealed.
 Investigation of spin-dependent effects in the conductivity of point contacts based on magnetically ordered materials and the discovery of the surface spin-valve effect implemented on an atomic scale.
 Implementation of a point-contact spin-diode based on a nanoscale double tunnel junction with a multilayer Fe/MgO structure, which is promising for the construction of various logic elements and memory.
 The pioneering research of the newest iron-based superconductors and topological semi-metals using the method of point contact spectroscopy has been carried out. The existence of the surface superconducting state in point contacts based on layered Weyl compounds MoTe2 and WTe2 has been revealed. The surface superconducting state in point contacts may have "topological" superconducting phases that are promising for use in the development of fault-tolerant quantum calculations.

Scientific and organizational work 

 Editor-in-Chief of the academic journal Low Temperatures Physics
 Chairman of the Scientific Council on Low Temperature Physics and Cryogenic Engineering at the Department of Physics and Astronomy of the National Academy of Sciences of Ukraine
 Chairman of the Special Committee for the Defense of Doctor's Dissertations
 Member of the Scientific Council of the National Research Foundation of Ukraine (2019-2020)
 Member of the Bureau of the Department of Physics and Astronomy of the National Academy of Sciences of Ukraine

Awards 

 The State Prize of Ukraine in Science and Technology (2015)
 The Badge of the National Academy of Sciences of Ukraine "For Professional Achievements" (2010)
 The B.I. Verkin Prize of the National Academy of Sciences of Ukraine (2006)
 Humboldt Research Fellowship (1995-1996)
 Youth Award of the First Degree of the Komsomol Central Committee of Ukraine and the Republican Council of Scientific and Technical Societies (1984)

Selected publications

Monograph 
Yu. G. Naidyuk, I.K. Yanson, Point-contact spectroscopy, Springer, New-York, 2005.

Reviews

Main scientific works

References 

1955 births
People from Rivne Oblast
Ukrainian physicists
National University of Kharkiv alumni
Living people
Laureates of the State Prize of Ukraine in Science and Technology